Alfred Goeldel-Bronikowen (born 12 March 1882, date of death unknown) was a German sport shooter who competed in the 1912 Summer Olympics. He competed in only two events and won medals in both.

References

External links
profile

1882 births
Year of death missing
German male sport shooters
Shooters at the 1912 Summer Olympics
Olympic shooters of Germany
Olympic silver medalists for Germany
Olympic bronze medalists for Germany
Olympic medalists in shooting
Medalists at the 1912 Summer Olympics